

Notes and references

NFL Today personalites
NFL Today personalities
NFL Today personalities